The 1954 Greyhound Derby took place during June with the final being held on 25 June 1954 at White City Stadium.  
The winner was Pauls Fun and the winning owner Mr Thomas Henry Watford received £1,500.

Final result 
At White City (over 525 yards):

Distances 
3¼, 1¾, 5, ¾, Dis (lengths)
The distances between the greyhounds are in finishing order and shown in lengths. From 1950 one length was equal to 0.08 of one second.

Semi finals

Competition Report
Pauls Fun was bought by Mr Thomas Watford for £1,750 and put with Wembley trainer Leslie Reynolds in 1953 after he recorded the fastest ever time at Dunmore Park for a puppy. He was immediately installed as one of the favourites for the 1954 Derby and following a winters rest he opened up at 7-4f which was the shortest price ever recorded Derby ante-post price to date. During the first round heats a deluge of rain made the track very heavy and the best time recorded that night was 29.37 by Pauls Fun; next best was 29.67 by Title Role, thirty spots slower.

A tough second round draw pitted Barrowside trained by Jack Harvey alongside Pauls Fun; Barrowside a leading hurdler had gained entry into the Derby after winning the last trial stake. The race caused a surprise when Pauls Fun missed the break and Barrowside won comfortably. After the race Leslie Reynolds announced that Pauls Fun has tweaked a muscle and it would be a race against time to be fit for the semi-finals to be held just two days later.

Pauls Fun took his place in the semi-finals and won comfortably by six and a half-lengths setting a new track record of 28.64 in the process. Barrowside in the same heat failed to progress finishing in fourth place. Title Role at odds of 4-11 could only manage third after a crowded second semi-final race won by Ashcroft Boy.

Wembley once again accounted for five of the six finalists with just one hound from Catford, Ardskeagh Ville, the Gold Collar champion. The final proved to be a formality for Pauls Fun because a gap opened on the run up after Ashcott Boy drifted wide and he took advantage of it running out an easy victor. Ashcott Boy fell at the first bend and trailed in last. Leslie Reynolds had won a record fifth Derby, a feat not emulated until 57 years later.

See also
1954 UK & Ireland Greyhound Racing Year

References

Greyhound Derby
English Greyhound Derby
English Greyhound Derby
English Greyhound Derby